Sopor is a condition of abnormally deep sleep or a stupor from which it is difficult to rouse a person. It involves a profound depression of consciousness, which is manifested by drowsiness, while maintaining coordinated defensive reactions to stimuli such as pain, harsh sound, and bright light, and preserving vital functions. Sopor may be caused by a drug; such drugs are deemed soporific. A stupor is more severe than a sopor.

The name is derived from Latin sopor (cognate with the Latin noun somnus and the Greek noun ὐπνος, hypnos).

Causes and symptoms
Soporous states can be caused traumatic, vascular, inflammatory, neoplastic, and toxic lesions of the brain.

Symptoms include lack of  response to the environment, perform any tasks, or respond to questions, but the ability to swallow is maintained.
Examination will reveal decreased muscle tone of the extremities and depression of tendon reflexes.
Pupillary reaction to light may be sluggish, but the corneal reflexes are preserved.
Paresis and Babinski sign may be present.

References

Sleep
Medical terminology